Running game may refer to:

 Running game (video game), a type of video game
 Running game (tables game), a tables game of parallel movement in which no hitting or pinning is permitted